This is a list of Buddhist temples, monasteries, stupas, and pagodas in Cambodia for which there are Wikipedia articles, sorted by location. 

Theravada Buddhism is the official religion of Cambodia, practiced by 95% of the population. Theravada Buddhist tradition is widespread and strong in all provinces, with an estimated 4,392 pagodas throughout the country. In Cambodia, the constitution states that "Buddhism is the state religion" and most of the people practice Theravada Buddhism.

Kampong Thom Province
 Prasat Kuh Nokor

Phnom Penh

 Wat Botum
 Wat Langka
 Wat Moha Montrey
 Wat Ounalom
 Wat Phnom
 Wat Preah Keo (Silver Pagoda)
 Wat Saravan

Pursat Province
 Wat Bakan

Siem Reap Province

 Angkor Wat
 Bayon
 Krol Ko
 Neak Pean
 Preah Khan
 Preah Palilay
 Ta Prohm
 Ta Som

See also
 Buddhism in Cambodia
 Supreme Patriarch of Cambodia
 Buddhist Institute, Cambodia
 Pchum Ben
 Dhammayietra
 Smot (chanting)
 Khmer architecture
 List of Buddhist temples

Notes

External links

 BuddhaNet's Comprehensive Directory of Buddhist Temples sorted by country
 Buddhactivity Dharma Centres database

 
Cambodia
Cambodia
Buddhist temples